Treviglio is a town and comune (i.e. municipality) in the province of Bergamo, in Lombardy, Northern Italy.

It's also part of the geographic area named "Gera d'Adda", included among the rivers Fosso Bergamasco to the North, Adda to the West and Serio to the East.

With approximately 30,000 inhabitants, the comune is now the second most populous town in the province.

It is rarely called "The tractor town" for the presence of the SAME Deutz-Fahr headquarters or seldom "The town of courtyards" for their preponderant presence in the Old Town.

It is subdivided in five main quarters: Old town, West zone, North zone, the recent built East zone and the PIP (Industrial Zone). Northward lie four frazioni (subdivisions): Geromina, Castel Cerreto, Battaglie and Cascina Pezzoli; once the village of Castel Rozzone was also a frazione of Treviglio.

The coat of arms is composed of a crenellated tower, which represents the city with its Ghibelline past; flanked by two golden lions rampant, for its free and valiant citizenry and topped by an eagle, symbol of the privileges obtained by the Holy Roman Empire, which is holding a pig aloft, symbol of the achieved prosperity.

History
The area where Treviglio lies was firstly inhabited by Celtic tribes, in particular Insubres.

During the conquest of the Cisalpine Gaul (Gallia Cisalpina) by the Romans a castrum was built to guard an important trading cross way and the near villages.

Afterward a Roman settlement was founded and grew through trade and local goods manufacture.

After the arrival of the Lombards the territory was included in the Fara Gera d'Adda (Fara which was an administrative division of the Lombard system) and, after the fall of the Kingdom of the Lombards it became part of the Holy Roman Empire.

Treviglio was founded in the Early Middle Ages as a fortified town, unifying three preexisting settlements: Cusarola (Celtic), Pisignano (Roman) and Portoli (Lombard). Thus the original town was divided into three districts, called 'portae' (Latin for "gates"), each headed toward one of the settlements: "Porta Torre" to the village of Cusarola; "Porta Zeduro" (named originally "Zelute") to Portoli and "Porta Filagno" to that of Pisignano.

The first official document found citing the new town dates back to November 964 D.C.

Around the year 1000 Treviglio harboured the inhabitants of Oriano, a commune near Brescia, which had been destroyed in the course of the struggle between Arduin of Ivrea and Henry II who were warring for the Imperial crown.
During the wars that had taken place in Northern Italy the city of Treviglio grew harbouring refugees in the new fourth district of "Porta Nova" (literally "New Gate"), originally called " Porta Oriano" for the refugees from Oriano.

The Rozzoni family, at that time powerful, tried in vain a coup d'état, and was as a consequence temporarily exiled in its property near Treviglio, "Castel Rozzone" (in Italian "Rozzoni's Castle") that nowadays is a village independent from the city itself.

In 1167 Treviglio joined the first Lombard League, which had the aim of preserving local jurisdiction and droit de régale, a purpose that was achieved with the victory over emperor Frederick I 'Barbarossa', at the Battle of Legnano. The earliest copy of the Statute found dates 1392 and is currently housed in the city's museum. It describes a government held by sixty Consuls- initially twenty each for everyone of the original ethnic communities, thereafter fifteen for each district - remaining in office for six months. The leading member of the Council and chief of Treviglio was the Chancellor (Cancelliere), similar to an actual mayor. This statute also required that no noble could be allowed to live within the city walls - and therefore to be elected Consul - so as to prevent their possible involvements in the power strives of the town and the town involvement in their struggles for power.

In 1395 Treviglio gained formal autonomy from the Empire, which it held as a "Separate Land of the Duchy of Milan",  except for several brief Venetian occupations (1431-1433; 1448–1453 and 1499–1509). These occupations are mentioned in The Betrothed, a renowned Italian novel by Alessandro Manzoni. At the last withdrawal in 1509, the city was burnt down by the departing Venetian troops. The French king Louis XII who witnessed the event, claimed to vindicate it in the subsequent Battle of Agnadello.

On 28 February 1522 General Odet de Foix Viscount of Lautrec, leading the French army through Northern Italy on its way to the South, came to punish the town for the insolence shown by denying supplies to the French troops and resisting them. The chronicles tell that the consuls of the city realised there was no chance of resisting the French army. Thus, they marched barefoot and with a rope at the neck to the General, offering the keys of the city and their lives in order to spare the populace. After the general refuse the surrender, the parish priest and the Duke of Milan tried to intercede for the town. The general refused, intended to make of the town a cautionary tale, therefore - so the story - the inhabitants took refuge in the churches because at the time they were supposed to provide legal and religious protection. Finally, when the French troops entered the town without encountering resistance, a fresco of Our Lady in front of which the inhabitants were praying, appeared to weep. 
Warned of this portentous event, the General checked the building and its walls to verify the veracity of the miracle and, finally persuaded, deposed helmet and sword at the feet of the fresco and left the city. Helmet and sword are still preserved in the Sanctuary, built with donations of the Treviglio's families only, and where was transferred the miraculous fresco over which were added, crowns forged with the jewels of the virgins of Treviglio. This act is due to the frequency of rape occurring during sieges and sackings. Even if not left pregnant, it was very difficult for raped women to find a husband. This episode is celebrated every year with a re-enactment, an historical parade and a novena (nine days of prayers). A popular song about the event is still sang in the town during those days.

After many long years of war, the French sold Treviglio to the Spaniards, albeit the town was formally still under the aegis of the Holy Roman Empire.

During this last domination the town as well as the whole region, knew an initial period of prosperity followed by a gradual decline, aggravated in the 17th century by an epidemic of plague.
The Spanish period ended transforming Treviglio in fief and auctioning it off to meet the debts of the Duchy [ of Milan ], but the town people fiercely opposed the measure and, after losing a lawsuit against the Senate of Milan, self-taxed themselves to buy the fief and its independence.

After the French Revolution in 1796, Treviglio became part of the Transpadane Republic, the following year of the Cisalpine Republic and, in 1805, of the Napoleonic Kingdom of Italy. It was during these years that many of the religious buildings were looted and a detailed official map of the town was drawn. Amusingly, the name of some streets include dialectal words because the French officers couldn't distinguish them names during the surveys. For example, "Via d'Iser" (in Italian, "street of Iser"), which was misspelled from "di ser", has Iser as a name while "di" means "of" and "ser" is the vulgar name of the tree Quercus cerris. Thus, in dialect it meant "street of the Quercus cerris trees".
The local dialect - like almost everywhere in Lombardy - preserves words and sounds, reminiscent of the frequent French occupations.

After the Congress of Vienna the town was included in the Kingdom of Lombardy–Venetia, then temporarily attached to the Kingdom of Sardinia during the first Italian War of Independence and, finally, the town joined the Kingdom of Italy in 1860.

On 17 December 1915 Benito Mussolini married in civil union Rachele Guidi in Treviglio,  after the future Duce had recovered in the local hospital.

With a Presidential Decree of 8 January 1960,  Treviglio was declared a City, as promised by King Victor Emanuel II in 1860, due to its historical involvement in the achievement of the Italian Independence.

Survived family names dating back to Treviglio are Bornaghi, Facchetti, Butinone (and variants), Carioli, Gatti (and variants), Manenti and Rozzoni.

Others, like Aresi, Cortesi, Conti, Colombo, Merisi and Monzio Compagnoni; are widespread, but originate from neighbouring villages or others places. For instance, Merisi is from Caravaggio and Aresi from Brignano Gera d'Adda. Colombo instead was the surname given to abandoned orphans in the Duchy of Milan.

Main sights
 Palazzo Municipale (Town Hall), finished in 1300. It was restored in 1582 and received another floor in 1873. It has an elegant portico.
 Basilica of San Martino, built in 1008 over the pre-Romanesque church of the Assunta. In 1482 it was remade in Lombard-Gothic style. The current façade, in the Baroque style, is from 1740. The interior has works by Gian Paolo Cavagna, Camillo Procaccini and other, but its most notable feature is the polyptych of Madonna with Saints by Bernardo Zenale and Bernardino Butinone (1485), considered one of the masterworks of 15th century Lombard art. The bell tower (a former civic tower) dates to the early 11th century. The bell tower is open and accessible every weekend.
 Sanctuary of Madonna delle Lacrime (1619). Named after Our Lady of Tears who saved, with her prodigious tears, the city from destruction by the French troops, led by General Odet de Foix, on 28 February 1522. It has been restored in 2019–2020.
 Silva Palace
 Galliari Palace 
 Gothic House 
 Semenza House
 Baccherra House
 House of the square
 Bar Milano, sited in Manara's square, is the city's historical cafe. Founded in 1896, still it retains the original furniture of the century and a counter in Art Nouveau style. It's told that Thomas Mann once visited it on his way to meet his brother in Palestrina.
 Church of San Carlo (17th century).
 Relief of the Gatta ("Kitty") in Manara's square, is a trophy of the medieval feud between Treviglio and the near town of Caravaggio, now remembered only by the annual bowling tournament.
 TNT ("Teatro Nuovo Treviglio", Italian for "New Theater of Treviglio") in Garibaldi's square. 
 The Filodrammatici (Old Theater).
 Ariston Multisala Cinema
The old city is composed primarily by courtyards tenements, most of them open to the public twice a year.
Many are also the sacred shrines, real places of worship boasting ancient traditions. On festive occasions the bell tower and the town squares are decorated with projections of images and animations.

Economy
Agriculture and trade were prominent in the economy of Treviglio from its beginning to today and, until the 20th century, there was a flourishing craft sector producing furniture and silk; then the swift industrial development and the relocation of that production made way to the mechanical (in particular the SDF, Bianchi bicycles), electrical and chemical industries which are still active.

The flow of the necessary capital for the establishment of new local enterprises, promoted the growth of the local bank, BCC (Credit Union) and of insurances agencies.

During the economic crisis many local enterprises were forced to close or were acquired by larger companies and their production transferred to Eastern Europe or Asia. The local bank undertook an expansion effort that weakened it and the local government focused on the development of services, tourism and trade.

The town attracts people from the surrounding villages with its services, while the Old Town boasts artisan food shops, cafes and fashion shops which are very appreciated.

Culture and education 
Treviglio has a central library, located in an adapted cloister, and four peripheral ones with more than 75,000 items, of which 10,000 are antique books, the library system is integrated in the Sistema Bibliotecario Integrato della Bassa Pianura Bergamasca (in English: Integrated Library System of the Lower Bergamo Plain) that group in its management thirty-one municipalities; from 2010 there is also available a free media library.

The town hosts two historical museum, two picture gallery, one scientific museum and two tiny natural protected areas.

All cultural activities are led by several historical and scientific associations.

There are two local newspapers, Il popolo cattolico (Catholic people) and Il Giornale di Treviglio (Treviglio's Journal).

There are at least three linguistic centres; seven kindergartens (both public and private); ten elementary schools (both public and private); four junior high schools (both public and private) and thirteen senior high schools (both public and private), including lyceums and technical schools, offering 23 different courses of study.

Sport 
Treviglio has a public sport centre and a public pool; a tennis centre, several fields for soccer, basketball and volleyball and gyms (both public and private).
The town is represented in many disciplines, among those football, basketball,  volleyball, athletics and rugby; with remarkable achievements in the regional context and beyond.
There are also schools of mountain climbing, cycling, BMX, motorcycle, equitation, diving, water polo, swimming, pilates, martial arts, artistic gymnastics and modern and classic dance.

Football Teams 

 C.S. Trevigliese A.S.D.
 G.S.D. Mario Zanconti 
 A.C.O.S. Treviglio Calcio

Basketball Team 

 Blu Basket Treviglio 1971

Rugby Team 

 Treviglio Rugby Club A.S.D.

Athletic Team 

 Atletica Estrada

Transport
Treviglio was among the first Italian cities featuring a railway station, in service between the late 1850s and 1878.

Today the town has two railway stations. The Treviglio Central Station (known as Treviglio Centrale) is on the Milan–Venice line, the Treviglio-Cremona and the Treviglio–Bergamo line; on this last lies also the West Station.

From 2009, the Central Station is also terminus for the lines S5 and S6 of the suburban train service of Milan.

The city can be reached by car with State Roads N.11 (Milano-Brescia) and N.42 (from Bergamo, to Lodi and Crema);  directly with the highway A35 (called BreBeMi, initials of the main cities connected through it: Brescia, Bergamo and Milan) and also the Provincial Roads 128, 129, 136, 141, 142 and State Road 472 which links Treviglio with the city of Lodi.

People
 Bernardino Butinone (Treviglio, about 1450  –  about 1510)
 Bernardo Zenale (Treviglio, 1463/1468 – Milan, 1526)
 Giovan Battista Dell'Era, artist (Treviglio, 1765 – Florence, 7 January 1799)
 Andrea Verga, neurologist, director of Ospedale Maggiore and senator of the Kingdom of Italy, founder and first president of the Italian Psychiatry Society (SIP) discoverer of the Cavum Vergae and among the first to study cannabinoids effects (Treviglio, 30 May 1811 – Milan, 21 November 1895)
 Pier Luigi Della Torre, surgeon, University professor and co-founder of the Civic Museum "Teresa ed Ernesto Della Torre" (Sannazzaro de' Burgondi, June 16, 1887 – Treviglio, 20 August 1963)
 Piero Mentasti, partisan and politician (Treviglio, 15 May 1897 – Venice, 24 September 1958)
 Trento Longaretti, painter (Treviglio, 27 September 1916 - Treviglio, 7 June 2017)
 Ildebrando Santagiuliana, writer and historian
 Tullio Santagiuliana, writer and historian
 Ermanno Olmi, film director, his family moved in Treviglio when he was an infant (Bergamo, 24 July 1931) 
 Giuseppe Merisi, catholic bishop (Treviglio, 25 September 1938)
 Giacinto Facchetti, former Inter and Italian Footballer, president of the club from 2004 to his death (Treviglio, 18 July 1942 – Milan, 4 September 2006)
 Battista Mombrini, engraver, sculptor and painter (Treviglio, 10 January 1944)
Valeria Fedeli, politician, former vice-president of the Senate (Treviglio, 29 July 1949).
 Edoardo Ronchi, former minister for agriculture and member of parliament, professor at the University of Bologna (Treviglio, 31 May 1950)
 Cesare Bornaghi, former olympic shooter of clay pigeon
 Simone Albergoni, motorcyclist Enduro
 Vittorio Carioli, former Footballer of A Series
 Domenico Casati, former Footballer of A Series
 Roberto Corti, former Footballer of A Series
 Giuseppe Erba, former Footballer of A Series
 Orlando Rozzoni, former Footballer of A Series
 Claudio Vertova, former Footballer of A Series
 Emanuele Merisi, former Olympic swimmer, bronze medal at the Atlanta Olympic Games of 1996; one gold, three silvers and four bronzes at the European Championship and three golds and one bronze at the Mediterranean Games. (Treviglio, 10 October 1972)
 Andrea Possenti, astrophysicist and scientific writer and speaker, director of the Cagliari Observatory (OAC) and discoverer of the first double pulsar in 2003 (Treviglio, 9 July 1963)
 Alberto Rossini, called "Il lupo" (tr. "the Wolf"), basketball trainer and former player of A Series (Treviglio,  10 June 1969)
 Alberto Belloni, physicist at the CERN and professor of Experimental Physics at the University of Maryland (Treviglio, 1984)

Twin towns
  Lauingen, Germany
  Romsey, United Kingdom

References
 Emanuele Lodi, Breve storia delle cose memorabili di Trevì, Milan 1647;
 I. Cantù, Bergamo e il suo territorio, Bergamo 1856;
 C. Cantù, Grande illustrazione del Lombardo-Veneto, Milan 1859;
 Carlo Casati, Treviglio di Ghiara d'Adda e suo territorio, Memorie storiche-statistiche, coi tipi della Perseveranza, Milan 1872;
 Marco Carminati, Il circondario di Treviglio e i suoi comuni, Treviglio 1892;
 Tullio e Ildebrando Santagiuliana, Storia di Treviglio, poligrafiche bolis of Bergamo, June 1965;
 M. Mochi Tullio Santagiuliana, Geradadda, Treviglio 1973;
 L. Cassani, E. Mandelli Tullio Santagiuliana, Il braccio di Treviglio, Calvenzano 1981;
 Marco Carminati, Il circondario di Treviglio e i suoi comuni. Cenni storici., Messaggi Tipography, Treviglio 1982;
 Paolo Furia, Il mio Santuario, Calvenzano 1982;
 Gianni Chiari, Le roggie Trevigliesi, edizioni CRAT, 1982;
 Tullio Santagiuliana, Briciole di storia di Geradadda antica, Calvenzano 1982;
 Piero Perego, Ildebrando Santagiuliana, Storia di Treviglio, edizioni Pro Loco - Treviglio, November 1987; edizione rinnovata dell'omonimo libro del 1965 e suddivisa in due volumi;
 Barbara e Giuseppe Oggionni, Le mura di Treviglio, Calvenzano 1991;
 Enrico de Pascale, Mariolina Olivari, Dizionario degli artisti di Caravaggio e Treviglio, Fiber Edizioni Bolis, Treviglio-Bergamo 1994;
 Le Terre del Lago Gerundo, edizioni Cassa Rurale, Treviglio, December 1996;
 Treviglio: alla riscoperta di un territorio, edizioni Cassa Rurale, Treviglio, February 1997;
 Istituto Professionale di Stato Zenale Buttinone, Conoscere la Gera d'Adda, edizioni Gera d'Adda, Ranica, 1999;
 Barbara Oggionni, Le rogge Moschetta e Vignola, Treviglio 2000;
 Barbara Oggionni, Treviglio, storia, arte, cultura, edizioni Pro Loco, Treviglio 2002;
 Barbara Oggionni, I borghi fortificati in Gera d'Adda: il triangolo di Treviglio - Caravaggio - Brignano in Territorio e fortificazioni. Confini e difese della Gera d'Adda, Bergamo 2003;
 La Gera d'Adda in Castra Bergomensia, province of Bergamo, 2004;
 Angelo Merletti, Marco Carminati e Barbara Oggionni  Treviglio è terra e gente edizioni Grafica e arte, 2006.

References

External links

  Treviglio official website
  Treviglio on the site of the Archidiocese of Milan 
  Proloco website
  Information about Treviglio
  Geological paper on Treviglio